Hamza Balje (born 13 September 1970) is a Kosovan politician of Gorani origin. He served as a member of the Kosovan Assembly from 2010 to 2014 and was appointed as a Vice Minister for Economic Development in 2018. Balje is the founder of the Center of Democratic Union, a political subject later integrated to the Unique Gorani Party (JGP).

References

1970 births
Living people
 Gorani people
Kosovan politicians